Muir Heights is a neighborhood in Pasadena, California, USA.

Education
Muir Heights is home John Muir High School, and is also served by Cleveland, Jackson and Washington Elementary Schools, Washington and Eliot Middle Schools.

Transportation
Muir Heights is served by Metro Local line 660 and 662; as well as Pasadena Transit line 20, 31, and 32.

Government
Muir Heights is part of Pasadena City Council District 1, represented by Tyron Hampton.

Neighborhoods in Pasadena, California